Cédric Pascal Régis Carrasso (born 30 December 1981) is a French former professional footballer who spent most of his career with Bordeaux and Marseille playing as a goalkeeper. He was also capped once for the France national team.

Club career

Marseille
Carrasso joined Marseille's youth system at the age of thirteen and, despite leaving for Avignon for one year in 1998, it was there that he signed his first professional contract. Before he had a chance to play for the first team, he was loaned out to Crystal Palace for the 2001–02 season, where he only got to play one match. Upon his return to Marseille, Carrasso made his debut for Marseille in a 2–0 win over Montpellier on 2 November 2002, where he got his first clean sheet in his professional debut and later on he replaced Vedran Runje for a couple of games, but seriously injured himself in an exhibition match against France 98 and was sidelined for the whole of the 2003–04 season. He was then loaned out again, this time to Guingamp, for the following season, and there he became the number one keeper for the first time in his career.

When he returned to Marseille, Carrasso was asked to fill in during Fabien Barthez's long ban. His performances were deemed impressive enough for him to retain the starting keeper position for the 2006–07 season and force Barthez to leave the club. On 9 October 2005, Carrasso signed a new contract, which would keep him until 2009. In the second leg of UEFA Cup on 16 March 2006 against Zenit Saint Petersburg leading 1–0 in the first leg, Carrasso received a red card in his Marseille career on a 90th minutes as the result was 1–1 which, meant that Zenit won 2–1 on aggregate. Carrasso remained as a first-choice goalkeeper for Marseille until on 22 August 2007, however, Carrasso injured his left Achilles tendon, which ruled him out for six months. During that time, Steve Mandanda stepped in and, when Carrasso finally returned, Eric Gerets informed him that he would be but the number two goalkeeper from then on.

Toulouse

Unwilling to spend another season on the bench, Carrasso joined FC Toulouse for the 2008–09 season. In Toulouse, he had the difficult task of replacing Nicolas Douchez, who had left for Rennes that same summer. On 10 August 2008, Carrasso made his debut for Toulouse in a 3–0 loss against Olympique Lyonnais. Despite the loss, Carrasso remained the first-choice goalkeeper ahead of Sébastien Hamel and Olivier Blondel. Toulouse conceded only 27 goals during the 2008 campaign, the fewest in the Championnat. Carrasso also has a total of clean sheet of 19 in the league.

Bordeaux
His performances attracted the attention of defending champions Bordeaux, who needed a replacement for the iconic but aging Ulrich Ramé, and on 30 June, he was acquired for a transfer fee of €8 million. Following his move to Bordeaux, Carrasso told L’Equipe that he was now looking forward to Champions League football with his new club. Carrasso also told L'Equpe:

Carrasso made his debut for Bordeaux in 4–1 win over Lens. By 9 August 2009, he had amassed a total of 29 clean sheets in League 1. Despite his success, Carrasso conceded 5 times to Lorient in a 5–1 loss on 19 February 2012 and received a straight red card in stoppage time, earning him a one-match ban. (This was Carrasso's second sending-off against Lorient, the first coming during his spell with Guingamp, when he was dismissed in minute 76 of the 1-1 draw between Lorient and Guingamp played 20 September 2004.) During his one-match ban, Ulrich Ramé, the man he replaced as first-choice keeper at Bordeaux, deputized for him. Carrasso returned to action against Brest in a 3–1 win on 6 March 2011. His consistent performances with Bordeaux resulted in a new contract running until 2015.  On 17 September 2011, during his third season at Bordeaux, with the Girondins winning 2–0 at half time against Toulouse, Carrasso received another red card, this time for a foul on Franck Tabanou. He was replaced by youngster Abdoulaye Keita, who conceded a late goal from Emmanuel Rivière in an eventual 3–2 loss. Once again, Carrasso received a one-match ban. On this occasion, newly arrived goalkeeper Kévin Olimpa took his place, mading his debut against Lille in a 1–1 draw. After serving his ban, Carrasso returned to action against Lyon in a 3–1 loss on 24 September 2010.

Galatasaray
Carrasso signed for Galatasaray after his contract with Bordeaux expired on 8 September 2017. After the end of 2017–18 season, the club did not offer him a new contract and Carrasco became a free agent.

International career
Thanks to excellent performances with Toulouse, Carrasso received his first call-up for the France national team for a friendly against Argentina on 11 February 2009. He was then called up for every subsequent France game by Raymond Domenech, but always in the role of third keeper behind Hugo Lloris and Steve Mandanda. He was included in the squad for the 2010 FIFA World Cup, but injured himself in training. Stéphane Ruffier was called up the fill-in as third choice keeper. However, FIFA denied France's request for this substitution, and Carrasso remained the official third keeper, despite the fact that Ruffier was training with the France squad.

When Laurent Blanc took over as the France manager, he also named Carrasso as his third keeper for every game (apart from a friendly against Norway, for which none of the 23 members of the previous World Cup were called up). Carrasso made his debut in the friendly game against Poland played on 8 June 2011. It was his only appearance for France at any level.

Career statistics

Club
Source:

Notes

Honours
Marseille
UEFA Intertoto Cup: 2005

Bordeaux
Trophée des Champions: 2009
Coupe de France: 2012–13

Galatasaray
Süper Lig: 2017–18

References

External links

1981 births
Living people
Sportspeople from Avignon
French footballers
France international footballers
Association football goalkeepers
AC Avignonnais players
Olympique de Marseille players
Crystal Palace F.C. players
En Avant Guingamp players
Toulouse FC players
FC Girondins de Bordeaux players
Galatasaray S.K. footballers
English Football League players
Ligue 1 players
Ligue 2 players
Süper Lig players
2010 FIFA World Cup players
UEFA Euro 2012 players
French expatriate footballers
Expatriate footballers in England
Expatriate footballers in Turkey
French expatriate sportspeople in England
French expatriate sportspeople in Turkey
Footballers from Provence-Alpes-Côte d'Azur